Magda Konopka (born March 15, 1943) is a Polish model and actress. She was born in Warsaw.

In December 1967, she married Franco-Canadian billionaire Jean-Louis Dessy in Chelsea, London. They separated after three months of marriage.

She is reported to have been one of the women with whom Sean Connery had affairs in the early 1970's prior to his divorce from Diane Cilento.

Filmography
 Becket (1964) (as Magda Knopke)
 Thrilling (1965)
 Sette monaci d'oro (1966)
 Pleasant Nights (1966)
 Golden Chameleon (1967)
 Love Nights in the Taiga (1967)
  Top Secret (1967)
 Satanik (1968)
 A Sky Full of Stars for a Roof (1968)
 Night of the Serpent (1970) (USA)
 Hell Boats (1970)
 When Dinosaurs Ruled the Earth (1970)
 Winged Devils (1971)
 Quickly, spari e baci a colazione (1971)
 Blindman (1971)
 Canterbury proibito (1972)
 Loves of a Nymphomaniac (1973)
 Love Angels (1974)
 Lucky Luciano (1974)
 Super Stooges vs. the Wonder Women (1974)
 Vice Wears Black Hose (1975)
 Diabolicamente... Letizia (1975)
 La Sposina (1976)
 La Campagnola bella (1976)
 La Cameriera nera (1976)
 La Casa (film) (1976)
 La Zia di Monica (1979)

References

External links
 

Polish film actresses
1943 births
Living people
Actresses from Warsaw
Polish female models
20th-century Polish actresses
Models from Warsaw